Theodore Roosevelt Elementary School was an elementary school in Louisville, Kentucky's Portland neighborhood. It was built in 1865. It was initially known as Eleventh Ward School, and became Duncan Elementary School in 1870, then Roosevelt Elementary School in 1920, in honor of former United States President Theodore Roosevelt.

References

National Register of Historic Places in Louisville, Kentucky
Defunct schools in Louisville, Kentucky
School buildings on the National Register of Historic Places in Kentucky
School buildings completed in 1865
1865 establishments in Kentucky
Renaissance Revival architecture in Kentucky